Líneas Aéreas Azteca  was an airline based in Mexico City, Mexico. It operated domestic scheduled services and international services to the USA. Its main base was Mexico City International Airport, with a hub at General Abelardo L. Rodríguez International Airport, Tijuana.

The airline's operations were suspended by the government in March 2007 due to safety problems, and in October 2007 the Mexican government permanently revoked its air operator's certificate because the company hadn't solved those problems. It was fined USD $417,000 for failing to correct the problems or refund airfare for canceled flights to consumers.

History 

The airline was established on 9 May 2000 and started operations on 1 June 2000, operating domestic services with Boeing 737 aircraft. It started up after TAESA closed down and some of the staff and assets were taken over.

Under the name Azteca Airlines, the airline was a member of the Airlines Reporting Corporation. Líneas Aéreas Azteca actively sought to expand international routes into the United States. In 2003, Azteca contributed a small amount to traffic through Ontario International Airport, California, constituting ~0.5% of passenger traffic in each of January and October. 

During the first two months of 2007, the airline transported 113,592 passengers, or 2.3% of total passengers in Mexico.

Operations suspension
Following weeks of speculation about the airlines' financial situation, on 26 March 2007, the Secretariat of Communications and Transport of Mexico (SCT) issued a 90-day operations-desist claim that immediately halted the airline's operations, in order for it to respond to its financial credit, personnel training, and aircraft maintenance issues. Following an inspection from 5 to 23 March 2007 that revealed problems with safety procedures and employee training, the airline's operators certification was suspended.

Following the suspension of operations, on 27 March 2007 the International Air Transport Association (IATA) also suspended Líneas Aéreas Azteca from its worldwide Billing and Settlement Plan (BSP).

Routes operated by Azteca were covered by 13 other airlines.

End of operations
On 10 October 2007, the General Civil Aeronautics Directorship (DGAC) of Mexico's Communications and Transport Secretariat permanently revoked Líneas Aéreas Azteca's air operator's certificate, because the airline did not have a sound financial statement after the previous suspension.

Destinations served

Mexico
Acapulco
Aguascalientes
Cancún
Chihuahua
Ciudad Juárez
Culiacán
Guadalajara - Focus city
Hermosillo
Mexico City - Hub
Mexicali
Monterrey - Focus city
Morelia
Oaxaca
Puebla
Puerto Vallarta
Tijuana - Hub
Toluca
Uruapan
Zacatecas

United States
California
Oakland
Ontario
New York
New York City
Texas
Laredo
El Paso

Fleet
The Líneas Aéreas Azteca fleet consisted on the following aircraft: 
3 Boeing 737-700 - XA-AEP, XA-AEQ, XA-TWF
6 Boeing 737-300 - XA-AAU, XA-AAV, XA-CAS, XA-TWG, XA-UCL, XA-UCP

References 

Defunct airlines of Mexico
Airlines established in 2000
Airlines disestablished in 2007